Johnny Earl Dawkins Jr. (born September 28, 1963) is an American basketball coach and former player who is the head coach for the UCF men's basketball team. From 2008 to 2016, he was the head coach of Stanford. He was a two-time All-American and national player of the year as a senior in 1986 while at Duke from 1982 to 1986. Dawkins subsequently played nine seasons in the National Basketball Association (NBA) with the San Antonio Spurs (1986–1989), Philadelphia 76ers (1989–1994), and Detroit Pistons (1994–1995).  From 1998 to 2008, he served as an assistant basketball coach at his alma mater, Duke.

Playing career

College

Dawkins was born and raised in Washington, D.C.  He played basketball at Mackin Catholic High School in Washington, D.C. before enrolling at Duke University. At Duke, he became the team's all-time leading scorer with 2,556 points, which stood until 2006 when JJ Redick surpassed it. In Dawkins' senior year at Duke, the 1985–86 season, the Duke Blue Devils attained a win–loss record of 37–3, which was an NCAA record for both games played and games won in a single season. They reached the 1986 NCAA championship game, where they lost to Louisville, 72–69. In his senior season, Dawkins averaged 20.2 points per game and won the Naismith College Player of the Year Award, presented to the nation's top Collegiate Basketball Player. He also served as alternate on the 1984 United States Olympic basketball team. He graduated with a degree in political science.

His jersey number 24 was later retired.  Dawkins has received a number of honors, including selection to the ACC 50th Anniversary men's basketball team honoring the 50 greatest players in Atlantic Coast Conference history and being named the 78th greatest player in college basketball history by The Sporting News'''s book, Legends of College Basketball'', in 2002.

NBA
In the 1986 NBA draft, Dawkins was selected by the San Antonio Spurs as the 10th pick overall.  He appeared in the 1987 NBA Slam Dunk Contest, where he finished sixth out of eight. He ended up playing in the NBA for nine seasons, also appearing for the Philadelphia 76ers and the Detroit Pistons.  In his NBA career, he averaged 11.1 points, 5.5 assists and 2.5 rebounds.

Coaching career
Following his NBA career, Dawkins went back to Duke University in 1996, where he worked as an administrative intern in the athletic department and was on the air as an analyst for Duke's home basketball games.  He joined the Duke coaching staff in 1998, working alongside head coach Mike Krzyzewski. He was promoted to associate head coach in charge of player development in 1999.

In April 2008, he was named head coach at Stanford University, succeeding Trent Johnson. During his time with the Cardinal, he became known as "the king of the NIT" (with crowns in 2012 and 2015). But Dawkins could not get over the hump in the NCAA tournament, with only one appearance (2014) in 8 seasons.

On March 14, 2016, at the conclusion of his eighth season, and after a disappointing one NCAA Tournament appearance in eight seasons as head coach, Dawkins was fired.

On March 23, 2016, Dawkins was hired as head coach by the University of Central Florida. Shortly thereafter, his son, Aubrey Dawkins, transferred from Michigan to play for his father.

On March 2, 2019, UCF defeated (#8 AP Poll/#6 Coaches Poll) Houston at Fertitta Center, stopping the nation's longest home winning streak at 33. With the win UCF entered the AP Poll for the first time since the 2010–11 Knights spent four weeks in the poll, peaking at 19.

Head coaching record

References

External links
 Stanford profile

1963 births
Living people
African-American basketball coaches
African-American basketball players
All-American college men's basketball players
American men's basketball coaches
American men's basketball players
Basketball coaches from Washington, D.C.
Basketball players from Washington, D.C.
College men's basketball head coaches in the United States
Detroit Pistons players
Duke Blue Devils men's basketball coaches
Duke Blue Devils men's basketball players
McDonald's High School All-Americans
Parade High School All-Americans (boys' basketball)
Philadelphia 76ers players
Point guards
San Antonio Spurs draft picks
San Antonio Spurs players
Shooting guards
Stanford Cardinal men's basketball coaches
UCF Knights men's basketball coaches
Archbishop Carroll High School (Washington, D.C.) alumni
21st-century African-American people
20th-century African-American sportspeople